The Burma Democratic Party (BDP) was a political party in Burma.

History
The party was established by Dobama Asiayone founder U Ba Sein in the early 1950s. The party had some support from Buddhist monks and, seeing itself as a right-wing alternative to the Anti-Fascist People's Freedom League, it joined the People's Democratic Front to contest 1951–52 general elections, with the alliance winning 19 seats.

It ran alone in the 1956 elections, but received just 2.9% of the vote and failed to win a seat. Its vote share fell to 0.1% in the 1960 elections, in which it again failed to enter Parliament.

References

Defunct political parties in Myanmar
Socialist parties in Myanmar